Horace Washington Dalley  (born December 17, 1954) is a Jamaican educator and politician, representing the People's National Party (PNP). He was Member of Parliament (MP) for the constituency of Clarendon Northern, serving from 1989 to 2007, and again from 2011 to 2020. He served as Minister of Land and Environment from 2001 to 2002, Minister of Labour and Social Security from 2002 to 2006, Minister of Health from 2006 to 2007 and again from 2015 to 2016.

Early life and education
Dalley was born on December 17, 1954 in Mitchell Town, Clarendon. He was educated at Mico University College. Prior to entering representational politics Dalley worked with the Ministry of Education in special projects. He served in the Diplomatic service and also worked as International Secretary for the People’s National Party (PNP).

Political career

Dalley was first elected to the House of Representatives from the Clarendon Northern constituency in the 1989 general election, polling 7,015 votes to 6,135 for J. A. G. Smith of the Jamaica Labour Party (JLP). He went on to win the constituency for the People's National Party (PNP) in the 1993, 1997, and 2002 general elections. From 1989 to 2001, Dalley served as Parliamentary Secretary in the  Ministry of Youth and Community Development, Ministry of Finance and Planning, Ministry of Production, Mining and Commerce and the Minister of State in the Ministry of Labour and Social Security. In 2001, he was appointed to the cabinet of P. J. Patterson as Minister of Land and Environment, succeeding Seymour Mullings. He was subsequently appointed Minister of Labour and Social Security in November 2002, succeeding Donald Buchanan. When Portia Simpson Miller became Prime Minister on March 30, 2006, she appointed Dalley to her cabinet as Minister of Health. He remained in office until the PNP went into opposition after its election defeat in September 2007. Dalley lost his seat in the 2007 general election to Laurence Broderick of the JLP, who polled 6,118 votes to Dalley's 5,891. Dalley was succeeded as Minister of Health by Rudyard Spencer. He regained the seat in the 2011 general elections, polling 7,663 votes to the JLP's Laurence Broderick (5,958). After the PNP returned to power in the December 29, 2011 general elections, Prime Minister Simpson-Miller appointed Dalley as Minister without portfolio in the Ministry of Finance, Planning and Public Service. On November 9, 2015, he again assumed the portfolio of Minister of Health upon the resignation of Fenton Ferguson. After the defeat of the PNP at the polls in the 2016 general election, Dalley served as opposition spokesman on Labour and Welfare. He again lost his seat in the 2020 general election, polling 5,345 votes to the JLP's Dwight Sibblies (6,058).

Honors and awards
Dalley was awarded the Order of Distinction, Commander Class, in 2014.

See also
 Ministry of Labour and Social Security (Jamaica)
 List of Ministers of Health of Jamaica

References

|-

|-

|-

1950 births
People from Clarendon Parish, Jamaica
Jamaican politicians
Ministers of Health of Jamaica
Government ministers of Jamaica
People's National Party (Jamaica) politicians
Living people